Si va Seh Mardeh (also Romanized as Sī va Seh Mardeh and Sīow Seh Mardeh; also known as  Sūsehmard and Su Shehmard) is a village in Yeylan-e Shomali Rural District, in the Central District of Dehgolan County, Kurdistan Province, Iran. At the 2006 census, its population was 55, in 14 families. The village is populated by Kurds.

References 

Towns and villages in Dehgolan County
Kurdish settlements in Kurdistan Province